The following Egyptian pilots are confirmed or alleged to have become flying aces by scoring five or more air-to-air victories while flying combat—mainly against the Israeli Air Force:

 Ali Wajai (alias Ali Wagedy) flew a MiG 21 with 5 confirmed aerial victories.
 Major Sami Marei was credited with five aerial victories between 1966 and 1968 while flying a MiG 21. Major Marei was killed in action on 26 February 1970.
 Captain Samir Aziz Mikhail of the 104th Air Brigade was credited with five aerial victories while flying a MiG 21.
 Captain Saad Dahman gained five aerial victories in a MiG 21.
Ahmed Al Mansoori 6 confirmed aerial victories

It is not known if this list is complete.

See also
Flying ace
List of Israeli flying aces
List of Syrian flying aces

Endnotes

Arab–Israeli conflict
Arab-Israeli
Egyptian
Egyptian Air Force
Flying aces
Flying aces
Egyptian flying aces